Ornamental Dingbats is a Unicode block containing ornamental leaves, punctuation, and ampersands, quilt squares, and checkerboard patterns.
It is a subset of dingbat fonts Webdings, Wingdings, and Wingdings 2.

History
The following Unicode-related documents record the purpose and process of defining specific characters in the Ornamental Dingbats block:

See also
 Dingbats (Unicode block)

References 

Unicode blocks